Two of a Kind is a 1951 American crime film directed by Henry Levin and starring Edmond O'Brien, Lizabeth Scott and Terry Moore.

Plot
Mike Farrell (O'Brien) is induced by con artists Brandy Kirby (Scott) and attorney Vincent Mailer (Knox) to purloin a rich couple's ten million dollar estate by having Farrell pose as their long-lost son.

When the old man refuses to change his will, Mailer decides to kill the couple, and Kirby plays along. Farrell refuses to assist and Mailer plans to kill him too. After a botched attempt, with Kirby's help, Farrell exposes the scam to the old man, dooming Mailer's plan, and allowing Kirby and Farrell to unite, as "Two of a Kind".

Cast
 Edmond O'Brien as Michael 'Lefty' Farrell
 Lizabeth Scott as Brandy Kirby
 Terry Moore as Kathy McIntyre
 Alexander Knox as Vincent Mailer
 Griff Barnett as William McIntyre
 Virginia Brissac as Maida McIntyre
 Robert Anderson as Todd

References

External links
 
 
 
 

1951 films
1951 crime drama films
American black-and-white films
Columbia Pictures films
Film noir
Films scored by George Duning
Films directed by Henry Levin
American crime drama films
Films produced by William Dozier
1950s English-language films
1950s American films